Cruachanside Camanachd Club is a  shinty club which plays in Taynuilt, Argyll, Scotland. It plays in South Division One. It is a partnership between Taynuilt Shinty Club and Glenorchy Camanachd at senior level, allowing both clubs to have representation at adult level.

History

The club was officially founded in 2022 as merger between the two clubs. They competed in the South Division One. They finished in the bottom half of the table. The club welcomed back Gary Innes to shinty, after the musician had retired for 8 years.

The Club's Black and Orange colours reflect the traditional black and white colours of Glenorchy and the orange of Taynuilt.

References

External links
 Taynuilt Sports Hub
 YouTube Video from 2019 with history of club

Shinty teams
Sport in Argyll and Bute
Sports clubs established in 2022
2022 establishments in Scotland